Nottingham Greyhound Stadium is a greyhound racing track and stadium on the outskirts of Nottingham, England.

Races at the course are held on Monday, Friday and Saturday evenings as well as an additional matinée meeting every Tuesday.

Competitions
The stadium holds several competitions annually:

The Select Stakes, (500 metres), invitation event
The Puppy Classic – August, (500 metres), puppy event 
The Produce Stakes – October, (500 metres), British-bred event
The Eclipse – November, (500 metres) 
The National Sprint – December, {(305 metres)
The Guineas (500 metres) (former event)

Origins and opening 
In 1970 the White City Stadium in Nottingham closed down leaving the city without greyhound racing. However members of the Severn and Trent greyhound clubs had maintained a presence in the council's thoughts and several years later plans for a new track within the Nottingham Racecourse site began to surface. The site of the racecourse was west of the village of Colwick and the racecourse had been open since 1892.

On 24 January 1980 the Colwick Park greyhound track opened, it was situated on the north side of the racecourse where a car parking area had stood and previous to that it had been an old bed of the River Trent. The circumference of the track was 442 metres and was described as a very good galloping track with long straights and the sand used was Worksop Grey. The Managing Director Jon Carter announced that there were over 2,000 attending the first meeting which consisted of eight races, six over 500m and two over 295m. The first winner was a greyhound called Tartan Al trained by W Horton who won in 32.98sec at odds of 7–1.

History

20th Century
An initial investment of £250,000 included the Panorama Room with a state of the art restaurant and totalisator. The first Racing Manager was Jim Woods, the Director of Racing was Terry Meynell and the first trainers were Bill Horton, Christine Lawlor, A Coppin, T Smith and one Charlie Lister. Another trainer that appeared on opening night was Geoff DeMulder and he joined the track in 1984. Racing took place on Monday, Thursday and Saturday evenings and the nature of the large track soon attracted some of the sports best greyhounds including Scurlogue Champ who broke the track record in October 1985 and then Ballyregan Bob who won two races at Nottingham that formed part of his world record breaking run during November 1985 & April 1986 with the first run creating a new track record. 
It was also in 1986 that Coventry closed resulting in the Eclipse competition finding a new home at Nottingham. In April 1989 the 'Outside Sumner' hare was replaced by the 'Bramich' and race distances were re-measured as 310, 500, 700 & 747m.

In 1988 Terry Corden took control of Nottingham from Wiseville Ltd, Corden had recently sold Derby Greyhound Stadium and had been successful during the property boom. Racing Manager Jim Woods left to join Monmore Green Stadium and was replaced by Mick Smith before Peter Robinson took over. One of the first tasks of the new owners was to invest in new facilities and in 1989 the track underwent a considerable upgrade.

A new competition introduced to the track in 1990 was the National Sprint, the important race had struggled to find a home since the closure of Harringay Stadium and would be held towards the end of the year and was known as the Peter Derrick Christmas Cracker for a few years. Trainer Dawn Wheatley trained Ayr Flyer, who finished runner-up in the 1994 English Greyhound Derby. 

Wembley closed to greyhound racing in 1996 and Nottingham was awarded the prestigious Select Stakes as a consequence in 1997. Trainer Charlie Lister won the 1997 English Greyhound Derby and Scottish Greyhound Derby with Some Picture.

It was voted 'Central Region Racecourse of the Year' by the British Greyhound Racing Board for 1998–1999.

21st Century
The track was voted 'Central Region Racecourse of the Year' by the British Greyhound Racing Board for a second time in 2001–2002. A new kennel range costing £250,000 was introduced in 2003. Stadium owner Terry Corden brought his daughter Rachel and son Nathan into the business and they are now both heavily involved in the running of the track. Another event (the Produce Stakes taken from Hall Green Stadium) came to the track in 2009.

In 2018 the stadium signed a deal with Arena Racing Company (ARC) to race every Monday and Friday evening and a matinée meeting every Tuesday. During 2019 the track was chosen as the new venue for the sport's most famous event, the English Greyhound Derby which switched from Towcester.

In 2020 the stadium was sold by Nottingham Greyhound Stadium Ltd to ARC. The Director of Nottingham Greyhound Stadium Rachel Corden was retained by ARC and appointed ARC Greyhound Operations Director. In 2021 the Derby returned to Towcester following two years at Nottingham.

Track records

Current

Former

References

External links

Greyhound racing venues in the United Kingdom
Sports venues in Nottingham
1980 establishments in England
Sports venues completed in 1980